Nybøllegård is a 19th-century cottage situated southwest of Stege, on the island of Møn, in southeastern Denmark. It was designed by the architect Gottlieb Bindesbøll for Hother Hage in  1856. It was listed in the Danish registry of protected buildings and places in 1972.

History
Christopher Friedenreich Hage was one of the wealthiest merchants on the island of Møn. His son Hother Hage pursued a career as a lawyer and politician in Copenhagen.

In 1853, Hother Hage purchased the Marielyst Mansion at Stege. Hother Hage married on 20 June 1856 Emmy Tutein, daughter of Peter Adolph Tutein at Marienborg Manor. Hage had around the same time charged the architect Gottlieb Bindesbøll with the design of a new house. Bindesbøll had a few years ago completed Stege's new town hall. Another source of inspiration for the choice of Bindesbøll as architect may have been Hans Puggaard's cottage Krathuset in Ordrup. Puggaard was married to Hage's aunt C. F. Hage (1798–1847).  Krathuset was commissioned by Puggaard from Bindesbøll as a gift to their children, one of whom was married to the politician Orla Lehmann. Hage, Puggaard and Lehmann belonged to the same National Liberal circles.

In 1859, Hage was appointed as bailiff of Stege (byfoged) as well as of Møn Herred (herredsfoged). In 1868, he was granted royal permission to rename his property Nøbøllegård (later changed to Nybøllegård).

Hage's already fragile health was weakened by his many outdoor duties following the 1872 Baltic Sea flood. He died at Nybøllegård on 9 February 1873. His widow married  Ditlev Gothard Monrad.

Anders Peter Andersen, a lieutenant and architect, resided at Nybøllegård at the time of the 1880 census. He lived there with his wife Christiane (née Frederiksen), their two children (aged and stadd.
	
The building was adapted in around 1900 and again in 1960. It has since 1999 been subject to comprehensive restoration work.

Architecture
 
The building is one of Bindesbøll's six so-called "cottages". Nybøllegård is a rectangular, single-storey building constructed on a foundation of boulders, with a broad lower bannd of red brick and yellow brick on the upper part of the ground floor. The garden side features an avant-corps with a gabled dormer window. The south gable of the building features a verenda and a balcony. The quarter-hipped roof with ornamental Bargeboars was originally thatched. It was later replaced with wooden shingles and now with roofing felt.

The ground floor interiors were decorated by Georg Hilker in Pompeian Styles.

Today
Nybøllegård is today owned by Thomas Christfort, a former conservative mp and current member of Bordingborg Municipal Council, who is also the owner of Overgård Manor in Jutland. He has established a storage facility for grain on the property. In 2016, he ceded the management of the company to his son Helge Christfort.

References

External links
Tenderings at the Danish National Art Library
Nybøllegård, Stege from Trap Danmark with illustrations (in Danish)

Listed buildings and structures in Vordingborg Municipality
Houses in Denmark
Møn
Buildings and structures associated with the Hage family
Houses completed in 1856